Chaudefontaine may refer to the following places in France:

 Chaudefontaine, Doubs, a commune in the Doubs department
 Chaudefontaine, Marne, a commune in the Marne department